There   are 25 high courts in India. The number of total judges sanctioned in these high courts are 1114 of which 840 judges are permanent and remaining 274 sanctioned for additional judges. , 333 of the seats, about 29%, are vacant.

Allahabad High Court, has the largest number (160) of judges while Sikkim High Court has the smallest number (3) of judges. The lists of high court judges are maintained by the Ministry of Law and Justice.

Maximum strength of judges in each High Court

Allahabad High Court 
The Allahabad High Court in the state of Uttar Pradesh can have 119 permanent judges as well as 41 additional judges, bringing its total sanctioned strength to 160 judges. The court currently has 103 judges.

Permanent judges

Additional judges

Andhra Pradesh High Court 
The Andhra Pradesh High Court sits at Amravati, the capital of the state of Andhra Pradesh, and can have maximum of 37 judges, of which 28 must be permanently appointed and 9 may be additionally appointed. The court currently has 31 judges.

Permanent judges

Additional judges

Bombay High Court
The Bombay High Court sits at Mumbai, the capital of the state of Maharashtra, and has additional benches in Aurangabad and Nagpur in Maharashtra, as well as Panaji in the state of Goa. It may have a maximum of 94 judges, of which 71 must be permanently appointed and 23 may be additionally appointed. Currently, it has a total of 65 Judges.

Permanent judges

Additional judges

Calcutta High Court 
The Calcutta High Court sits at Kolkata, the capital of the state of West Bengal, and has additional benches sitting at Port Blair in the Andaman and Nicobar Islands, as well as at Jalpaiguri in West Bengal. It can have a total of 72 judges, of which 54 judges must be permanently appointed and 18 may be additionally appointed. Currently, it has 53 judges.

Permanent judges

Additional judges

Chhattisgarh High Court
The Chhattisgarh High Court sits at Bilaspur in the state of Chhattisgarh, and may have a maximum of 22 judges, of which 17 may be permanent and 5 may be additionally appointed. Currently, it has 13 judges.

Permanent judges

Additional judges

Delhi High Court 
The Delhi High Court sits at Delhi, the capital of India, and may have a maximum of 60 judges, of which 46 may be permanently appointed and 14 additionally appointed. Currently, it has 45 judges.

Permanent judges

Additional judges

Gauhati High Court 
The Gauhati High Court sits at Guwahati in the state of Assam, and has a maximum permitted strength of 30 judges, of which 22 may be permanently appointed, and 8 may be additionally appointed. Currently, it has 23 judges.

Permanent judges

Additional judges

Gujarat High Court
The Gujarat High Court sits at Ahmedabad, in the state of Gujarat and is permitted to have a maximum strength of 52 judges of which 39 may be permanently appointed and 13 additionally appointed. Currently, it has 29 judges.

Permanent judges

Additional judges

Himachal Pradesh High Court 
The Himachal Pradesh High Court sits at Shimla in Himachal Pradesh, and is permitted to have a maximum of 17 judges of which 13 may be permanently appointed and 4 may be additionally appointed. Currently, it has 9 judges.

Permanent judges

Additional judges

Jammu & Kashmir and Ladakh High Court
The Jammu and Kashmir and Ladakh High Court sits at Srinagar in the summer, and in Jammu in the winter, and has jurisdiction over Jammu and Kashmir and Ladakh. It is permitted to have a maximum of 17 judges, of which 13 may be permanent and 4 may be additionally appointed. Currently, it has 15 judges.

Permanent judges

Additional judges

Jharkhand High Court 
The Jharkhand High Court sits at Ranchi and has jurisdiction over the state of Jharkhand. It is permitted to have a maximum of 25 judges of which 20 may be permanently appointed and 5 may be additionally appointed. Currently, it has 21 judges.

Permanent judges

Additional judges

Karnataka High Court 
The Karnataka High Court sits at Bangalore and has jurisdiction over the state of Karnataka. It is permitted to have a maximum of 62 judges of which 47 may be permanently appointed and 15 may be additionally appointed. Currently, it has 53 judges.

Permanent judges

Additional Judges

Kerala High Court 
The Kerala High Court sits at Kochi and has jurisdiction over the state of Kerala. It is permitted to have a maximum of 47 judges of which 35 may be permanently appointed and 12 may be additionally appointed. Currently, it has 37 judges.

Permanent judges

Additional judges

Madhya Pradesh High Court 
The Madhya Pradesh High Court sits at Jabalpur and has jurisdiction over the state of Madhya Pradesh. It is permitted to have a maximum of 53 judges, of which 39 may be permanently appointed and 14 may be additionally appointed. Currently, it has 31 judges.

Permanent judges

Additional judges

Madras High Court 
The Madras High Court sits at Chennai and has jurisdiction over the state of Tamil Nadu. It is permitted to have a maximum of 75 judges, of which 56 may be permanently appointed and 19 may be additionally appointed. Currently, it has 58 judges.

Permanent judges

Additional judges

Manipur High Court 
The Manipur High Court sits at Imphal and has jurisdiction over the state of Manipur. It is permitted to have a maximum of 5 judges of which 4 may be permanently appointed and 1 may be additionally appointed. Currently, it has 3 judges.

Permanent judges

Additional judges

Meghalaya High Court 
The Meghalaya High Court sits at Shillong and has jurisdiction over the state of Meghalaya. It is permitted to have a maximum of 4 judges of which 3 may be permanently appointed and 1 may be additionally appointed. Currently, it has 3 judges.

Permanent judges

Additional judges

Orissa High Court 
The Orissa High Court sits at Cuttack and has jurisdiction over the state of Odisha. It is permitted to have a maximum of 33 judges of which 24 may be permanently appointed and 9 may be additionally appointed. Currently, it has 21 judges.

Permanent judges

Additional judges

Patna High Court 
The Patna High Court sits at Patna, and has jurisdiction over the state of Bihar. It may have a maximum of 53 judges, of which 40 may be permanently appointed and 13 may be additionally appointed. Currently, it has 31 judges.

Permanent judges

Additional judges

Punjab and Haryana High Court 
The Punjab and Haryana High Court sits at Chandigarh, and has jurisdiction over the states of Punjab and Haryana and the union territory of Chandigarh. It may have a maximum of 85 judges of which 64 may be permanently appointed and 21 may be additionally appointed. Currently, it has 65 judges.

Permanent judges

Additional judges

Rajasthan High Court 
The Rajasthan High Court sits at Jodhpur and has jurisdiction over the state of Rajasthan. It may have a maximum of 50 judges of which 38 may be permanently appointed and 12 may be additionally appointed. Currently, it has 33 judges.

Permanent judges

Additional judges

Sikkim High Court 
The Sikkim High Court sits at Gangtok and has jurisdiction over the state of Sikkim. It may have a maximum of 3 judges, all of whom must be permanently appointed. Currently, it has 3 judges.

Permanent judges

Telangana High Court 
The Telangana High Court sits at Hyderabad and has jurisdiction over the state of Telangana. It may have a maximum of 42 Judges of which 32 may be permanently appointed and 10 may be additionally appointed. Currently, it has 32 judges.

Permanent judges

Additional judges

Tripura High Court 
The Tripura High Court sits at Agartala and has jurisdiction over the state of Tripura. It may have a maximum of 5 judges of which 4 may be permanently appointed and 1 may be additionally appointed. Currently, it has 2 judges.

Permanent judges

Additional judges

Uttarakhand High Court 
The Uttarakhand High Court sits at Nainital and has jurisdiction over the state of Uttarakhand. It may have a maximum of 11 judges of which 9 may be permanently appointed and 2 may be additionally appointed. Currently, it has 5 judges.

Permanent judges

Additional judges

List of Judges by seniority (in cumulative) 
Judge names which don't have date of retirement indicated are "Additional Judges".

See also 

 List of chief justices of India
 List of sitting judges of the Supreme Court of India
 List of current Indian chief justices

References

External links
 

 
High Courts